Santo Tirso is a city and municipality located in the north of Porto Metropolitan Area, 25 km from central Porto, Portugal. In the region, the Ave Valley, there is a large center of textile industry. The population in 2011 was 71,530, in an area of 136.60 km².

Another important center in the municipality is Aves.

The Santo Tirso Monastery built in 978 is a point of interest.

History

The History of Santo Tirso is tied to its benedictine monastery. The town grew around it and, from 978 until 1834, it was a "couto" – a neutral area that belonged to the clergy. Known initially as Santo Tirso de Riba de Ave, this city has been the capital of a municipality at least since 1833. Its composition changed throughout the years, especially in 1998, when the nearby city of Trofa created its own municipality, taking some of Santo Tirso's towns with it.

Towards the middle of the 19th century, Santo Tirso spearheaded the industrialization of the Ave Valley. One of the first textile factories in the region, the Fábrica de Fiação e Tecidos do Rio Vizela, opened in Vila das Aves, part of its municipality, in 1845. This factory would become the largest of its kind in Portugal, with an area of about nine square kilometres and employing, at one point, over 3.000 people.

Geography
The highest point in the municipality is in the Alto de S. Jorge, in the parish of Refojos, with 527 meters of altitude.

Climate
Santo Tirso has a Mediterranean climate with warm to hot summers and mild, very wet winters.

Parishes

Administratively, the municipality is divided into 14 civil parishes (freguesias):

 Agrela
 Água Longa
 Areias, Sequeiró, Lama e Palmeira
 Aves
 Carreira e Refojos de Riba de Ave
 Lamelas e Guimarei
 Monte Córdova
 Rebordões
 Reguenga
 Roriz
 Santo Tirso, Couto (Santa Cristina e São Miguel) e Burgães
 São Tomé de Negrelos
 Vila Nova do Campo
 Vilarinho

Sports
Santo Tirso is home of the historic football club Futebol Clube Tirsense and C.D. Aves.

Notable people 

 Luís Gonzaga Ferreira da Silva (1923–2013) a Prelate of the Catholic Church & bishop of the Diocese of Lichinga
 Sofia Andrade (born 1988) a Portuguese politician

Sport 

 Alberto Festa (born 1939) a retired footballer with 143 club caps and 19 for Portugal
 José Pacheco (born 1942) a former cyclist, competed at the 1960 Summer Olympics
 Quim Machado (born 1966) a former footballer with 320 club caps a current manager.
 Gaspar Azevedo (born 1975) known as Gaspar, a retired footballer with 429 club caps
 Ricardo Rocha (born 1978) a retired footballer with 362 club caps and 6 for Portugal
 Pedro Moutinho (born 1979) a retired footballer with 343 club caps
 Orlando Neto (born 1979), known as Orlando, a former footballer with 386 club caps
 Rui Pedro Silva (born 1981) a track and field, long distance and cross country athlete, competed at the 2008 & 2012 Summer Olympics
 Sara Moreira (born 1985) a cross country, road, middle & long distance track runner.

References

External links

 Santo Tirso City Fporum
 F.C. Tirsense
 On-line Journal Santo Tirso.eu
 Online Santo Tirso Portal

Cities in Portugal
Municipalities of Porto District